Kalauzlija may refer to:
 Kalauzlija, Karbinci, North Macedonia
 Kalauzlija, Radoviš, North Macedonia